Amnon Yekutieli is an Israeli mathematician, working in noncommutative algebra, algebraic geometry and deformation quantization. He is a professor of mathematics at the Ben-Gurion University of the Negev.

Professional career
Born in Rehovot, Israel, he earned both his bachelor's and master's degrees at the Hebrew University of Jerusalem. His master thesis was done under the supervision of Shimshon Amitsur. He received his Ph.D. from the Massachusetts Institute of Technology in 1990, after studying there with Michael Artin. Yekutieli received the Alon Fellowship in 1993. He joined the Ben-Gurion University of the Negev in 1999.

Selected publications

References

 CV .

External links

1959 births
20th-century Israeli  mathematicians
21st-century Israeli mathematicians
Einstein Institute of Mathematics alumni
Massachusetts Institute of Technology alumni
Academic staff of Ben-Gurion University of the Negev
Israeli Jews
Jewish scientists
Living people